Aclytia petraea is a moth of the family Erebidae. It was described by Schaus in 1892. It is found in Peru.

References

Moths described in 1892
Aclytia
Moths of South America